General elections were held in Italy on 23 May 1886, with a second round of voting on 30 May. The "ministerial" left-wing bloc emerged as the largest in Parliament, winning 292 of the 508 seats. As in 1882, the elections were held using small multi-member constituencies of between two and five seats.

Campaign
The Historical Left was led by the Prime Minister of Italy, Agostino Depretis, a prominent member of the Italian politics for decades. Depretis had been head of the government since 1881 and also from 1876 to 1879.

The leader of the Historical Right was Antonio Starabba di Rudinì, a conservative marchese from Sicily.

The  Historical Far-Left was led by Felice Cavallotti, a famous Italian poet.

The Left emerged as the largest in Italian Parliament, winning 292 of the 508 seats, before the Right, which gained 145 seats. As in 1882, the election was held using small multi-member constituencies with between two and five seats.

Parties and leaders

Results

References

General elections in Italy
Italy
General
Italy